The 1998 CFL Draft took place on April 7, 1998. 43 Canadian football players were chosen from among 490 eligible players from Canadian universities as well as Canadian players playing in the NCAA.

Round one

Round two

Round three

Round four

Round five

Round six

References

External links 
 

Canadian College Draft
Cfl Draft, 1998